Conrad Max Benedict Brann (born July 20, 1925 in Rostock, Germany, died June 23, 2014) was a German-British linguist and professor at University of Maiduguri in Nigeria. Brann opened a personal library in his living area that influenced the lives of language/linguistics students and English students.

Career

Brann's early life was spent in Germany and Italy.

Brann studied Linguistics and International Relations in Hamburg, Rome, Oxford, Paris and Bruges. He taught English Language at the University of Hamburg and was from 1958 to 1965 in the administration of UNESCO. Brann lived in Nigeria from 1966.

He is the founder and was from 1977 head of the Department of Languages and Linguistics at the University of Maiduguri.

His main work has been definition and explanation of language use in a multilingual or bilingual societies, with focus on Nigeria.

Honors
 1990: Order of Merit of the Federal Republic of Germany
 1999: Festschrift in Honour of Conrad Max Benedict Brann, University of Maiduguri
 2004: Member of the Order of the Federal Republic, Nigeria

Literature
 William Charles McCormack, Stephen Adolphe Wurm (ed.): Language and society: anthropological issues. - Mouton, 1979
 Brann, C.M.B., "Lingua Minor, Franca & Nationalis". In: Ammon, Ulrich (ed.). Status and Function of Languages and Language Varieties. Berlin: Walter de Gruyter, 1989, pp. 372–385
 Brann, C.M.B., "Reflexions sur la langue franque (lingua franca): Origine et Actualité", La Linguistique, 30/1, 1994, pp. 149–159
 Brann, C.M.B., "The National Language Question: Concepts and Terminology." Logos [University of Namibia, Windhoek] Vol 14, 1994, pp. 125–134

References

External links
 "Conrad Max Benedict Brann," Rüdiger Köppe Verlag (bio from The Nation (Nigeria), 13 March 2010)

Linguists from the United Kingdom
Linguists from Germany
2014 deaths
1925 births
Academic staff of the University of Maiduguri
Recipients of the Cross of the Order of Merit of the Federal Republic of Germany
German expatriates in Italy
German expatriates in the United Kingdom
German expatriates in France
German expatriates in Belgium
German expatriates in Nigeria